This is a list of singles to top the German Media Control Top100 Singles Chart in 1985.

See also
List of number-one hits (Germany)

Notes

References

 German Singles Chart Archives from 1956
 Media Control Chart Archives from 1960

1985
Number-one hits
Germany